Oleksandr Hranovskyi (Oleksandr Mykhailovych Hranovskyi) (born Dec. 25, 1979) – Ukrainian politician, Member of Parliament of Ukraine of the 8th Ukrainian Verkhovna Rada, Petro Poroshenko Bloc "Solidarity".

By the end of 2017, he entered the rating of “100 most influential Ukrainians” according to the magazine “Focus”, in February 2018 – the rating of “TOP-20 most influential lawyers of Ukraine” according to the publication “Delovaya Stolitsa” (12th place in the ranking), in August 2018 – the rating of “100 the most influential people of Ukraine” according to the magazine “Novoe vremja strany” (68th place), and in 2019 – the rating of the most influential young politicians according to the Foundation "Ukrainian Politics".

Education 

In 2001, he graduated from the International Solomon University with a bachelor's degree in economics.
In 2016 he graduated from Ternopil National Economic University with a Bachelor of Laws degree, and in 2018 at the same university he received a master's degree in law.

Business career 

From 2001 to 2007, he worked as finance director of retail and entertainment network centres “Caravan”.

From 2007 to 2009 – as a partner of the American-Ukrainian private architecture office “Laguarda Low Design and Development”.

From 2009 to 2014, Oleksandr Hranovskyi was a chairman of the board of directors of Assofit Holdings Limited.

From 2010 to 2014, he was the chairman of the supervisory board of the company Assofit Holdings Limited.

Business conflict 

In 2006, Estonian businessman Hillar Teder began to build “SkyMall” shopping center in Kyiv. In 2010, due to the difficulties associated with the global economic crisis, Teder started looking for an investor for the project. That same year, businessman Andrey Adamovskiy through Assofit Holdings Limited invested $40 million in “SkyMall” and in return he got 50% plus 1 share of the shopping centre. Under the terms of the deal, Adamovskiy had to sell his share back for $50 million.
But within the specified period, Adamovskiy refused to sell his share, arguing that Teder allegedly violated the terms of the deal. Legal proceedings that accompanied the dispute over the ownership of Assofit Holdings Limited were held in British, Cypriot and Ukrainian courts.

On June 9, 2011, the London court recognized that the businessman's termination of the shareholder agreement with Teder was legitimate and found that Teder has violated several terms of the deal. The court also ordered an Estonian businessman to transfer a shareholder debt of about $100 million under the overall control of Adamovskiy and Teder. Teder has not yet fulfilled this arbitration award and it remains valid.

On July 13, 2012, Teder was finally refused to challenge the court decision, and on February 21, 2014, the said decision was recognized in Cyprus.

On October 28, 2014, the Goloseevsky District Court of Kyiv established that the obligation to transfer a shareholder debt of about $100 million under the overall control of Adamovskiy and Teder ceased due to the reissuing of the relevant claim rights from Filgate Credit Enterprises Enterprise Limited (control of the company was carried out by Teder) to Assofit Holdings Limited. 

During the trial, the court found that Teder did not take any action to transfer these loans under the overall control with Adamovskiy. In addition, Teder carried out actions contrary to the commitment.

According to the results of consideration of the case, the court also found that Hillar Teder did not have the right to demand the transfer of the claim rights on shareholder debt to the company that is controlled by him and Adamovskiy. May 5, 2016 the London Court of International Arbitration decided to transfer all shares of Assofit Holdings Limited to the ownership of Arricano Real Estate Plc no later than June 5 of the same year. But no action followed, and Adamovskiy gained full control over “SkyMall”.

Hranovskyi refuted the allegations of Teder and his lawyer in the raider seizure of “SkyMall” and he announced the involvement of the estonian company Arricano in the leak of materials from the State Bureau of Investigation of Ukraine.

Political career 

From May 25 to November 30, 2014, he was a deputy of the Kyiv City Council from the party “UDAR” under No.23. He was a member of the budget issues and socio-economic development Commission and a member of the temporary utility inspection and other economic entities commission. The commission inspected those utilities and other economic entities, in the authorized capital of which there is a share of property of the territorial community of Kyiv.

During the elections on October 26, 2014, he passed to the Verkhovna Rada under No. 58, Petro Poroshenko Block. In Parliament he was elected the head of the Subcommittee on civil affairs, economic and administrative proceedings of the Committee on Legal Policy and Justice. Hranovskyi is a member of Committee on Legal Policy and Justice.

As a deputy introduced several bills to improve the activities of the prosecutor's office, bills for judicial improvements, property rights registration enhancements, improvements in registration of legal entities and individuals, bills which concern the Constitutional Court of Ukraine and The Supreme Council of Justice of Ukraine.

November 1, 2018 was included in the list of Ukrainian individuals against whom the Government of Russia imposed economic sanctions.

May 29, 2019 Oleksandr Hranovskyi left the party "Petro Poroshenko Bloc "Solidarity".

In the 2019 Ukrainian parliamentary election Hranovskyi tried to win a seat in Constituency № 169 situated in Kharkiv as an independent candidate. But he lost the election to Oleksandr Kunytskyi of the party Servant of the People.

Social activity 

Oleksandr Hranovskyi appealed to the President of Ukraine Petro Poroshenko and the commission on
pardon with a petition for clemency of a life convicted Lyubov Kushinska. Kushinska was the first woman in Ukraine who was sentenced to life. She also became the first woman to be pardoned by the president.

People's Deputy Oleksandr Hranovskyi helps homeless animal shelter “Sirius”, he has five dogs at home and convinces his colleague in parliament Ihor Kononenko to take home an animal from a shelter.

Oleksandr Hranovskyi helped Kachanovsky correctional colony of Kharkiv, putting medical beds and installing a 3D cinema. Also, the deputy continues to work on the unraveling of the cases of some life-sentenced.

On November 30, 2018, Hranovskyi was elected president of the Kharkiv Regional Chess Federation. The politician replaced Sergey Gusarov in this post. At the beginning of 2019, he held a chess tournament between the Kyiv and Kharkiv regional federations, in which talented children, grandmasters and Olympic champions took part.

Founder of the Oleksandr Hranovskyi Charitable Foundation.

Family 

Oleksandr Hranovskyi has two daughters: Nonna and Asya.

References

External links 

 Oleksandr Hranovskyi Charitable Foundation
 Deputy profile on the website of the Verkhovna Rada

1979 births
Living people
Politicians from Kyiv
Businesspeople from Kyiv
Eighth convocation members of the Verkhovna Rada